The Collins Robert French Dictionary (marketed in France as Le Robert et Collins Dictionnaire) is a bilingual dictionary of English and French derived from the Collins Word Web, an analytical linguistics database.  As well as its primary function as a bilingual dictionary, it also contains usage guides for English and French (known as Grammaire Active and Language in Use respectively), English and French verb tables, and maps of English and French speaking areas.

Its two main competitors are Harrap's Shorter French Dictionary published by Chambers Harrap Publishers and the Oxford-Hachette French Dictionary published by Oxford University Press in conjunction with Hachette.

Publications

William Collins & Sons releases
Collins-Robert French Dictionary (Unabridged)
1st edition
2nd edition

HarperCollins releases
Collins-Robert French Dictionary (Unabridged)
3rd edition
4th edition
5th edition
6th edition
7th edition
8th edition
9th edition (Collins Robert Complete & Unabridged French Dictionary)
/ (HarperCollins Publishers version, hardcover)
?th impression (2010-04-29)
 (Dictionnaires Le Roberts-SEJER version, hardcover)
10th edition (Collins Le Robert French Dictionary)
/ (hardcover)
?th impression (2016-08-25)
Collins Robert Concise French Dictionary: Paperback version of Collins-Robert French Dictionary with reduced contents, focused on contemporary readers.
8th Revised edition
/ (hardcover)
? impression (2011-07-01)
Collins French Dictionary and Grammar: Dictionary contents is based on Collins Robert Concise French Dictionary, but with extensive grammar sections.
Collins French Dictionary and Grammar Essential edition/Collins Essential French Dictionary & Grammar: Collins French Dictionary and Grammar with reduced contents, focused on portability. It includes full coverage of GCSE words.
Collins French Phrasebook and Dictionary
Collins French Concise Dictionary: Dictionary contents are printed in 2 colours (black/blue).
5th edition
/
? impression (2010-06-15)
Collins Robert French Dictionary Concise Edition/Collins Le Robert French Dictionary Concise Edition
?th edition: Includes 240,000 translations.
/ (paperback)
? impression (2016-06-02)
Collins Robert French Dictionary (abridged)/Collins Le Robert French-English/English-French Dictionary: This version include smaller contents than the Collins Robert French Dictionary Concise Edition.
?th edition
/
? impression (2011-07-01)

Collins Gem series
Collins Gem French Dictionary/Collins French Dictionary Gem Edition
Collins Gem French Verbs
Collins Gem French Phrasebook and Dictionary/Collins Gem Collins French Phrasebook

Collins Easy Learning series
Collins Easy Learning French Verbs and Practice
Collins Easy Learning French Grammar and Practice
Collins Easy Learning French Grammar
Collins Easy Learning French Conversation
Collins Easy Learning French Dictionary
Collins Easy Learning French Idioms

Dictionnaires Le Robert releases
Le Robert & Collins La référence en anglais Grand Dictionnaire
 (dictionary only),  (with electronic dictionary, 1-year subscription to new edition of GRAND ROBERT & COLLINS dictionary)
Dictionnaire Le Grand Robert & Collins/Le Grand Robert & Collins The complete translation tool
Le Robert & Collins Business
Le Robert & Collins Business compact
Le Robert & Collins Collège Anglais
Le Robert & Collins Compact+ Anglais: Includes electronic dictionary for PC.
Le Robert & Collins Vocabulaire Anglais et Americain
Le Robert & Collins la grammaire facile Anglais
Le Robert & Collins Maxi Anglais:
Le Robert & Collins Maxi+ Anglais: Includes electronic dictionary for computers.
Le Robert & Collins Poche Anglais: Includes audio lessons.
 (paperback)
Le Robert & Collins Poche+ Anglais: Le Robert & Collins Poche Anglais in hard cover.

Le Robert & Collins Mini Anglais: Includes audio lessons.
 (paperback)
Le Robert & Collins Mini+ Anglais: Le Robert & Collins Mini Anglais in hard cover.

Electronic versions
Le Robert & Collins Le Grand Robert & Collins: Computer-based electronic dictionary.
 (PC version, 3 activation),  (Mac version, 3 activation),  (PC version, free 10-day trial),  (browser version 3.0, 12-month subscription)
Le Robert & Collins anglais avancé: Levels B1-B2
 (PC version, 3 activation)
Le Robert & Collins anglais essentiel: Levels A2-B1
 (PC version, 3 activation)

External links

Collins
CollinsDictionary.com – Internet front-end to Collins French Dictionary content.
Google Play page: Collins French Dictionary
iTunes page: Collins-Robert Concise French Dictionary By Ultralingua, Inc.

Le Robert
Le Robert pages: Dictionnaires bilingues Anglais - Dictionnaire Le Robert, Le Grand Robert & Collins téléchargement PC
iTunes page:  Le Petit Robert de la langue française By Diagonal

See also 

 Collins Spanish Dictionary

French dictionaries
English bilingual dictionaries
William Collins, Sons books